"Aanewala Pal" is an Indian Hindi song from the Bollywood film Gol Maal. The lyrics of the song was written by Gulzar. Kishore Kumar was the playback singer of this song. This song was one of the hit songs sung by Kishore Kumar.

Picturisation 
In the film Gol Maal, the song is picturised with Amol Palekar and Bindiya Goswami.

Awards 
Gulzar, won a Filmfare Award for Best Lyricist, in 1980, for this song.

References

External links 
 

Indian songs
Hindi-language songs
1979 songs